Dylan Skee is an Australian rugby league footballer. He previously played for Harlequins, Whitehaven, and the London Skolars in the Co-operative Championship One.

References

Career stats

External links
Quins profile
Super League profile

1986 births
Living people
Australian emigrants to England
Australian rugby league players
London Broncos players
London Skolars players
Place of birth missing (living people)
Rugby league five-eighths
Rugby league halfbacks
Whitehaven R.L.F.C. players